Trunkline Pipeline is a natural gas pipeline system which brings gas from the Gulf coast of Texas and Louisiana through Mississippi, Arkansas, Tennessee, and Kentucky to deliver gas in Illinois and Indiana. It connects to the Henry Hub, Egan Hub, and  Perryville Hub. It is operated by Trunkline Gas Company, a subsidiary of Energy Transfer Partners. Its FERC code is 30.

The pipeline project started when on March 12, 1947, independent owners of South Texas gas reserves incorporated Trunkline Gas Supply Company. In 1949–1950, the project was taken over by Panhandle Eastern energy company.

In 1998, the pipeline was acquired by CMS Energy from Duke Energy, which absorbed Panhandle Eastern few years earlier.

In 2012, it was announced that a  section of the pipeline will be converted to crude oil pipeline to transport Canadian and Bakken oil from Patoka, Illinois, to St. James, Louisiana. This project was cancelled. In 2014, the Energy Transfer Crude Oil Pipeline Project (ETCOP) was announced. ETCOP will use  of the existing  Trunkline, which will be converted and reversed. In addition,  of new pipeline will be built. In Patoka, the ETCOP will be connected with the Dakota Access Pipeline. The pipeline runs through Illinois, Kentucky, Tennessee, Mississippi, Arkansas, and Louisiana, and its terminus will be near Nederland, Texas.

See also
Enbridge

References

External links
Pipeline Electronic Bulletin Board

Natural gas pipelines in the United States
Natural gas pipelines in Texas
Natural gas pipelines in Louisiana
Natural gas pipelines in Mississippi
Natural gas pipelines in Arkansas
Natural gas pipelines in Tennessee
Natural gas pipelines in Kentucky
Natural gas pipelines in Illinois
Natural gas pipelines in Indiana